Personnel economics has been defined as "the application of economic and mathematical approaches and econometric and statistical methods to traditional questions in human resources management". It is an area of applied micro labor economics, but there are a few key distinctions. One distinction, not always clearcut, is that studies in personnel economics deal with the personnel management within firms, and thus internal labor markets, while those in labor economics deal with labor markets as such, whether external or internal. In addition, personnel economics deals with issues related to both managerial-supervisory and non-supervisory workers.

The subject has been described as significant and different from sociological and psychological approaches to the study of organizational behavior and human resource management in various ways. It analyzes labor use, which accounts for the largest part of production costs for most firms, by formulation of relatively simple but generalizable and testable relationships. It also situates analysis in the context of market equilibrium, rational maximizing behavior, and economic efficiency, which may be used for prescriptive purposes as to improving performance of the firm. For example, an alternate compensation package that provided a risk-free benefit might elicit more work effort, consistent with psychologically-oriented prospect theory. But a personnel-economics analysis in its efficiency aspect would evaluate the package as to cost–benefit analysis, rather than work-effort benefits alone.

Personnel economics has its own Journal of Economic Literature classification code, JEL: M5 but overlaps with such labor economics subcategories as JEL: J2, J3, J4, and J5.  Subjects treated (with footnoted examples below) include:
 firm employment decisions and promotions, including hiring, firing, turnover, part-time and temporary workers, and seniority issues related to promotions
 compensation and compensation methods and their effects, including stock options, fringe benefits, incentives, family support programs, and seniority issues related to compensation
 training, especially within the firm
 labor management, including team formation, worker empowerment, job design, tasks and authority, work arrangements, and job satisfaction
 labor contracting devices, including outsourcing, franchising, and other options.

History of Personnel Economics 
The field can be dated back to 1776, where Adam Smith, a British Economist believed that within the labor market equilibrium, there is a possibility that a trade-off between a worker's wages and non-monetary working conditions exists. However, Personnel Economics did not come into prominence until 1987, where the Journal of Labor Economics published 10 articles around the field. During the 1990s, Personnel Economics slowly became more empirical based, up until this point the field was more heavily theoretical. Personnel Economics is considered to be a branch of Labor Economics, in 1998, Edward Lazear described it as 'the use of economics to understand the internal workings of the firm'. Since new data has become more widely available, the field has evolved to have a more practical use. Econometric techniques have played a huge role in the development of the field, with data being used to analyze personnel records and other human resource data, this is known as Insider Econometrics.

Theory, Testing, and Possible Uses
Personnel economics began to emerge as a distinct field from a flurry of research in the 1970s that sought to answer the questions of how prices of goods and services traded within a firm are determined.  An early difficulty that the subject addressed is possible differences between the interests of an employer considered as wanting cost-free output and employees as wanting cost-free income. The relationship is represented at a general level in the principal-agent problem whose solution is the firm modeled as a set of contracts for efficiently allocating risk and monitoring the performance of the production team and its members. Many questions about wage determination and the relationship between wages and productivity in a firm or government enterprise were raised as a result. The subject was developed in addressing those questions, including examination of pay structure and promotions within hierarchical organizations.
  
Major theories of the subject developed in the late 1970s and 1980s from the research of Bengt Holmström, Edward Lazear, and Sherwin Rosen to name but a few.  Research threads included analysis of:
 Compensation according to piece rate, that is contributions to output, both when output is easily measured or when only the worker knows the difficulty of the job and his own contribution,
 efficiency-improving contracts as constrained by noise in production contributions, moral hazard, and distribution of risk aversion,
 compensation based on principles of tournament theory as a possibly more efficient substitute for piece-rate compensation.

From the later 1980s, researchers began to forge closer links with experimental economics, including generation of data to test the theories in the field. Other empirical studies conducted then utilized data from sports (e.g. golf tournaments and horse racing). and company records on their suppliers' performances (e.g. raising broiler chickens).

From the 1990s, there was a further surge of empirical tests of the theory from wider availability of personnel records of large companies to researchers and interest in the relation between compensation and productivity and the implications of imperfect labor markets and rent-seeking behavior for the subject.

A retrospective collection of the personnel economics-literature is in Lazear et al., ed. (2004), Personnel Economics, Elgar, with 43 articles dating from 1962 to 2000 (link to contents link here).

Two millennial articles by a contributor to the subject argued in the course of review and assessment to the conclusions that:
[B]ecause of the relevance and newly found rigor of personnel analysis, personnel economics should and will become a more important part of the educational curriculum. The field is growing and has a large potential audience, of both students and practitioners.

Gift Exchange Theory 
The Gift Exchange Theory, also referred to as the fair-wage theory, applies when employees are provided with better wages than they could receive at another firm, in exchange for a higher work standard. 

In 1993 a laboratory experiment (Fehr et al., 1993)  was conducted to perceive the effects that the Gift Exchange Theory had on employee effectiveness. Contrary to predictions, it was found that most employers were offering higher (sometimes by more than 100%) than market clearing wages. On average, the higher wage was requited by a higher output, often making it very profitable for employers to offer high wage contracts. Paying for an employees performance can lead to increased productivity, and higher competition surrounding highly skilled workers who will want to work for employers who pay for performance.

Tournament Theory 
Tournament Theory was proposed by Edward Lazear and Sherwin Rosen. The theory addresses how pay raises are associated with promotions. The theory’s main point is that promotions are a relative gain. Regarding compensation, the level of compensation must be strong enough to motivate all employees below the level of compensation who aim to be promoted. If the pay spread between promotions is larger, the incentive of employees to put in effort will also be larger. The desired outcome from this would be to see employees performing at a quality and producing a quantity of output that the organization deems desirable. Compensation is also not necessarily determined by the conception of productivity. Employees are promoted based on their relative position within the organization and not by their productivity. However, productivity does hold some weight when considering promotion.

Advantages vs Disadvantages 

 Incentive Performance: Workplaces that promote competition among employees may benefit from incentivized performance. Studies have shown that competition within the workplace helps boost performance because employees value the idea of being better than the rest.
 Matching Workers and Jobs: Under Tournament Theory, workers are matched to their appropriate job. Firms with a tournament structure in the workplace are more likely to hire more competitive and highly-skilled workers, and firms with a workplace based structured around equity are more likely to hire less competitive and lower-skilled workers.

 Inequality within the Workplace: Workplaces that are based around a tournament structure are prone to creating an unequal working environment. If workers are paid based on their performance, it has the potential to leave some employees worse off than others. This type environment could also be more demotivating for under-performing workers and more motivating for over-achieving workers which results in a bigger payoff gap between the two types of workers over time.
 Unethical Behavior: A problem with competition in a workplace is that it is prone to promoting unethical behavior within employees. As they are competing against each other, they may succumb to inappropriate actions that can hurt another employee's standing within the company.

Principal-Agent Problem 
The Principal-Agent Problem is based on the relationship between an employer (principal) and an employee (agent). In this case, the employer relies on their employees to maximize the firm’s utility. In practice, incentives are sometimes misaligned between the principal and the agent. This occurs due to differing goals between the two, this can lead to adverse selection for the principal when hiring an agent, they cannot fully evaluate an agent's skills and moral hazard for the agent when presented with more information than the principal.

Approaches to Resolving Conflict 

 Fixed payment with monitoring
 Fixed salaries are provided to agents while their performance is under observation.
 Disadvantages: Shirking, monitoring costs and adverse selection.
 Incentive pay without monitoring
 Payment is correlated with output and performance is not monitored.
 Disadvantages: Inequitable pay and compensation
Shirking: No incentive to act in the best interest of the principal/firm because the agent is guaranteed pay.

Monitoring Costs: Additional resources and costs to monitor and measure agent performance.

Adverse Selection: Agents will look elsewhere for a job where performance is not as heavily monitored.

Inequitable Pay: Prone to delays and interruptions, and unreasonable to punish agents for these issues.

Compensation: Principals may have to provide agents a risk premium as agents bear a risk with payment.

Team Production 
Over time, more firms have adopted team production instead of pursuing individual production. There are advantages and disadvantages to adopting team production. Team production can be more productive than individual protection, work can be distributed between employees based on each of their specific skill sets. It may be more efficient than leaving all the work to one sole individual. However, there are also disadvantages with team production. The time it takes to organize teams and have them cooperate can be time consuming. There is also the potential risk of having a free-rider problem, individuals within a team can get away with no contribution to the work and still be compensated the same amount as their peers. However, the free-rider problem can be eliminated. One solution is by organizing set protocols, this allows for easier communication and decision-making. This gives each member of the team responsibilities and requirements that are agreed upon. Punishing free-riders is another way to deter them from repeating the offense. Even though free-riding is an issue when working as a team, the benefits may outweigh the potential disadvantages:

 Many projects require a wide variety of skill sets, one individual is not likely to have all the required skills to complete the project by themselves. If members of the team have complementary skill sets, they will be able to benefit off each other allowing for more efficiency in the project.
 Teamwork offers different perspectives, each member may have a different way on how to handle the project. By sharing ideas, teams can produce a better quality work than if the project was done by an individual.
 Easier for firms to hire people with less skills, each specializing in a few skills than hiring an individual with a wide variety of skills. Individuals with a high skill set are also more expensive to hire.
 It is unlikely that one individual will have an absolute advantage over everyone else, hence it may be better to split tasks among a group instead.

Pay Compression 
Pay compression, a compensation issue where wage or salary levels are non-distinguishable between long-term employees and newly hired employees. This issue develops over time, and if no action is taken to resolve this issue, organizations run a risk of a turnover. Long-term employees will feel they are undervalued and will look for work elsewhere. However, a certain degree of pay compression may lead to an efficient market outcome.

Organizations with more of a team-based work environment could consider a certain degree of pay compression. Pay compression in this case would make equity more relevant in close comparisons. It can also help boost morale and worker efficiency but may lead to high productive workers leaving to join a competitor organization with a higher wage or salary. It also helps insure employees during uncertain outcomes, such as bad market conditions. However, this leaves employees vulnerable to moral hazard problems and they may put less effort into their work.

Working alongside the Tournament Theory, employees may improve their image not only by making themselves look better, but also by making their rivals look worse. Having pay being based on relative performance may cause some issues within the workplace. Co-workers will be less likely to cooperate with each other knowing that there is an opportunity to outshine each other. Pay compression can help in this case by closing the salary gap between job levels. Which in turn gives less incentive for employees to sabotage their co-workers.

Hedonic Model of Compensation 
The Hedonic Model is a revealed preference method used to estimate the demand or value of a good to a consumer. In the case of Personnel Economics, the model is used to estimate the value of compensation for a worker. Employees care more than just their wage or salary; they care for things outside of money. Such as:

 Flexible work hours
 Comfortable and enjoyable working environment
 Health insurance and pension benefits
 Recognition and mentoring from bosses

Preferences show that older workers tend to favor health insurance or pension benefits than younger workers. The Hedonic Model of Compensation helps firms to solve the balance between costs and benefits, with the goal to offer the best mixed package of pay and benefits to entice workers. The final package is determined by the preferences of the employees, the cost structure of the firm, and the desire to hire employees.

The Hedonic Model has several predictions:

 There is a negative trade-off between wages and “positive” job attributes.
 Each firm offers the benefits that attracts their most valued type of worker.

These benefits are costly for a firm, but they are also helpful by boosting productivity.

Human Resource Practices in Personnel Economics 
The human resource practices that firms adopt have been changing to allow for more incentive pay and with a bigger focus on teamwork. Although not all firms have experienced success with these new changes. When introducing a new practice, it is important to have other practices alongside to increase the chance of success and the outcome. Firms run the risk of not reaching optimal output if they choose not to run all practices. Economists and non-economists acknowledge the important value of complementary practices, human resource practices can be viewed as complements as the more that are implemented, the more effective the other practices become. This is important for when firms consider practices such as teamwork and incentive pay, they would need to consider the value of a set of practices over an individual practice.

Studies have shown the effectiveness of adopting a system of complementary practices rather than individual-based practices. Ichniowski, Shaw, and Prennushi (1997) found that steel mills that used a complementary set of practices were substantially more productive compared to their counterparts that used a limited set.

Motivation-enhancing HR practices 
In human resource management, there are two types of practices that organizations use, skill-enhancing practices and motivation-enhancing practices.

List of motivation-enhancing practices that are used in human resource:
 Performance pay vs. fixed pay
 Performance Pay: Pay based on the performance of the worker.
 Fixed Pay: Pay that is fixed for all workers.
 Close supervision vs. freedom and trust
 Close Supervision: Work is monitored and closely reviewed.
 Freedom and Trust: Workers are less monitored and have more freedom.
 Reward seniority vs. reward (comparative) performance
 Reward Seniority: Benefits for staying with a company in the long-term.
 Reward Performance: Rewarded on the basis of performance, rather than seniority.
 Job security (tenure) vs. competitive selection
 Job Security: Insured a secure long-term job regardless of performance.
 Competitive Selection: Workers compete for jobs, under-performing workers are likely to be let go and over-achieving workers stay.
 Intrinsic motivation vs. extrinsic rewards
 Intrinsic Motivation: Appreciation of the work employees produce, motivation to work harder.
 Extrinsic Rewards: Monetary rewards for producing high quality work.
 Benefits and entitlements vs. additional pay
 Benefits and Entitlements: Compensation in the form of non-monetary payment, e.g., insurance, pension, etc.
 Additional Pay: Compensation in the form of monetary payment.

Skill-enhancing HR practices 
 Staff development programs vs. Peer training
 Staff development programs: Refers to 'all the policies, practices, and procedures used to develop the knowledge, skills, and competencies of staff to improve the effectiveness and efficiency both of the individual and the company.'
 Peer training: Enhancement of skills through interactions with a person's peers.
 Hiring for talent vs. Hiring for experience
 Hiring for talent: New employees are selected based on their innate ability, interest and motivation towards a certain type of work.
 Hiring for experience: New employees are selected based on their previous experience in a similar position.
 Promoting diversity vs. Focusing on 'merit' 
 Promoting diversity: Expanding the scope of a company in terms of individual differences such as race, or religion.
 Focus on merit: Focusing on the individuals who are most deserving, based on performance.

See also
 Efficiency wage
 Human capital
 Internal labor market

Notes

References
 Blank, David M., and George J. Stigler, 1957. The Demand and Supply of Scientific Personnel, NBER & UMI. Chapter-preview links.
 Hutchens, Robert M., 1989. "Seniority, Wages and Productivity: A Turbulent Decade,"  Journal of Economic Perspectives, 3(4), pp. 49–64.
 Montgomery, James D., 1991. "Social Networks and Labor-Market Outcomes: Toward an Economic Analysis," American Economic Review 81(5), pp. 1408–1418.
 Shapiro, Carl, and Joseph E. Stiglitz, 1984. "Equilibrium Unemployment as a Worker Discipline Device," American Economic Review, 74(3), pp. 433–444.